Tim Stewart (born 15 February 1985) is an Australian professional golfer. A former Australian Amateur champion, he turned professional in November 2008 and played primarily on the Asian Tour.

Personal life
Stewart was born in Sydney, Australia, but moved to Singapore in 1989. After another stop in Kuala Lumpur, Malaysia, he returned to Sydney in 1998 and lives there today on its Northern Beaches. Stewart first began playing golf at the age of seven, when his father began taking him to the Green Fairways driving range in Singapore.

Career
Stewart began playing as an amateur while attending school in 2003, finding considerable success and winning the Monash Masters in 2005. In that same year, he also finished as runner-up in the Mollymook Open. Stewart made a huge splash in 2006 by winning the Australian Amateur at Royal Hobart in 2006. With that win under his belt, Stewart began playing full-time, finishing as runner-up in the Rice Planters Amateur, Eastern Amateur, Dunes Medal, and Yowani Open Amateur in 2006. He was able to capture more championships in 2007, at the historic Riversdale Cup and the Singapore Open Amateur. Stewart also finished second at both the British Amateur (to American Drew Weaver), as well as the New South Wales Amateur Championship. Finally, Stewart scored another win in 2008, this time at the Tasmanian Open.

In November 2008, Stewart announced that he was turning pro.

On 1 April 2009, Stewart clinched a place in the 2009 Open Championship at the International Final Qualifying in Asia, capturing the final spot in a nine-man playoff.

Stewart played on the Asian Tour in 2009 and 2011–2013. He played on the Challenge Tour in 2010 and the PGA Tour China in 2014. His best finishes were T-9 at the 2009 Iskandar Johor Open and T-9 at the 2010 The Princess.

Sponsorships
Stewart signed with Nike Golf when he turned professional and played with Nike golf equipment between 2008 and 2011. He is currently the Touring Professional for Terrey Hills Golf and Country Club in Sydney, Australia.

Amateur wins
2005 Monash Masters
2006 Australian Amateur
2007 Riversdale Cup, Singapore Open Amateur

Professional wins (3)

PGT Asia wins (1)

Other wins (2)
2008 Tasmanian Open (as an amateur)
2018 Tahiti Open

Team appearances
Amateur
Eisenhower Trophy (representing Australia): 2008
Bonallack Trophy (representing Asia/Pacific): 2008
Nomura Cup (representing Australia): 2007 (winners)
Sloan Morpeth Trophy (representing Australia): 2007
Southern Cross Cup (representing Australia): 2007 (winners)
Four Nations Cup (representing Australia): 2007 (winners)
Australian Men's Interstate Teams Matches (representing New South Wales): 2006 (winners), 2007 (winners), 2008

References

External links

Australian male golfers
PGA Tour of Australasia golfers
Asian Tour golfers
Golfers from Sydney
1985 births
Living people